Events from the year 1554 in Sweden

Incumbents
 Monarch – Gustav I

Events

 25 September - The monarch orders the burghers of the capital to finance the building of Naval ships.
 - Publication of Historia de omnibus Gothorum Sveonumque regibus by Johannes Magnus.
 - The beginning of the Russo-Swedish War (1554–57). 
 - The nuns and monks of the Nådendal Abbey in the province of Finland is forcibly converted and the silver of the abbey is confiscated.

Births

Deaths

 
 
 - Anna Leuhusen, abbess (date of birth unknown)

References

 
Years of the 16th century in Sweden
Sweden